Pirenperone (developmental code names R-47456, R-50656) is a serotonin receptor antagonist described as an antipsychotic and tranquilizer which was never marketed. It is a relatively selective antagonist of the serotonin 5-HT2 receptors and has been used in scientific research to study the serotonin system. In the 1980s, the drug was found to block the effects of the lysergic acid diethylamide (LSD) in animals, and along with ketanserin, led to the elucidation of the 5-HT2A receptor as the biological mediator of the effects of serotonergic psychedelics.

Synthesis
The sidechain is formed from the cyclization of 2-aminopyridine with 2-Acetylbutyrolactone (2) in PPA gave 3-(2-hydroxyethyl)-2-methylpyrido[1,2-a]pyrimidin-4-one [41078-67-5] (3). Halogenation replaces the hydroxy with the chloride leaving group. Many syntheses do both steps in one-pot with phosphorus oxychloride.

The 4-(4-Fluorobenzoyl)Piperidine [56346-57-7] has 12 known named uses.

The alkylation between 3-(2-chloroethyl)-2-methylpyrido[1,2-a]pyrimidin-4-one [41078-70-0] (1) and 4-(4-fluorobenzoyl)piperidine hydrochloride [25519-78-2] (2) afforded pirenperone (3).

See also
 Altanserin
 Ketanserin
 Setoperone
 Risperidone
 Ocaperidone

References

5-HT2 antagonists
Antipsychotics
Anxiolytics
Fluoroarenes
Ketones
Piperidines
Pyridopyrimidines